Telemidae, also known as long-legged cave spiders, is a family of small haplogyne spiders. Most are cave dwelling spiders with six eyes, though some do not have any eyes at all. There are about 104 described species in sixteen genera.

Physical features
The legs are long, thin, relatively spineless, and do not have trichobothria. They have three pairs of spinnerets, the longest of which is toward the head. Instead of book lungs, they have two pairs of tracheal spiracles. The elongate abdomen bears a hardened ridge above the pedicel running in a zigzag pattern that is more clearly defined in males than females. The pedipalp on males is oval and bag-like with a thin spermatophore. The female pedipalp does not have a claw.

Genera

, the World Spider Catalog accepts the following genera:

Apneumonella Fage, 1921 — Asia, Africa
Burmalema Zhao & Li, 2022 — Myanmar
Cangoderces Harington, 1951 — Cameroon, Ivory Coast, South Africa, DR Congo
Guhua Zhao & Li, 2017 — Kenya
Jocquella Baert, 1980 — Papua New Guinea
Kinku Dupérré & Tapia, 2015 — Ecuador
Mekonglema Zhao & Li, 2020 — China, Thailand, Laos
Microlema Zhao & Li, 2022 — Thailand, Vietnam
Pinelema Wang & Li, 2012 — China, Vietnam
Seychellia Saaristo, 1978 — Africa
Siamlema Zhao & Li, 2020 — Thailand
Sundalema Zhao & Li, 2020 — Thailand, Indonesia
Telema Simon, 1882 — Asia, Guatemala, Europe
Telemofila Wunderlich, 1995 — Singapore, Malaysia, New Caledonia, Indonesia
Usofila Keyserling, 1891 — United States
Zhuanlema Zhao & Li, 2020 — Laos

See also
 List of Telemidae species

References

 Platnick, N.I. (1986). On the tibial and patellar glands, relationships, and American genera of the spider family Leptonetidae (Arachnida, Araneae). American Museum Novitates 2855. PDF Abstract (with info on Telemidae)

 
Araneomorphae families